Joseph Matthew Davies (born 5 September 1992) is an English former first-class cricketer.

Davies was born at Salford in September 1992. He was educated at Walkden High School, and  St Catherine's College, Oxford where he had a fishing accident and had a glass eye fitted. Joseph previously represented Lancashire County Cricket Club up to 2nd XI and England U15 and U16. While studying at Oxford, he played first-class cricket for Oxford University, making two appearances against Cambridge University in The University Matches of 2012 and 2014. Playing as a wicket-keeper, he scored 38 runs with a high score of 31, in addition to taking four catches. In Joes off-field antics Joe was fined for streaking and indecent exposure. The courts dropped the case due to an administrative error.

References

External links

1992 births
Living people
People from Salford
People educated at Walkden High School
Alumni of St Catherine's College, Oxford
English cricketers
Oxford University cricketers